A spectrofluorometer is an instrument which takes advantage of fluorescent properties of some compounds in order to provide information regarding their concentration and chemical environment in a sample. A certain excitation wavelength is selected, and the emission is observed either at a single wavelength, or a scan is performed to record the intensity versus wavelength, also called an emission spectrum. The instrument is used in fluorescence spectroscopy.

Operation
Generally, spectrofluorometers use high intensity light sources to bombard a sample with as many photons as possible. This allows for the maximum number of molecules to be in an excited state at any one point in time. The light is either passed through a filter, selecting a fixed wavelength, or a monochromator, which allows  a wavelength of interest to be selected for use as the exciting light. The emission is collected at the perpendicular to the emitted light. The emission is also either passed through a filter or a monochromator before being detected by a photomultiplier tube, photodiode, or charge-coupled device detector. The signal can either be processed as digital or analog output.

Systems vary greatly and a number of considerations affect the choice. The first is the signal-to-noise ratio. There are many ways to look at the signal to noise of a given system but the accepted standard is by using the Raman signal of water. Sensitivity or detection limit is another specification to be considered, that is how little light can be measured. The standard would be fluorescein in NaOH, typical values for a high end instrument are in the femtomolar range.

Auxiliary components
These systems come with many options, including:
Polarizers
Peltier temperature controllers
Cryostats
Cold Finger Dewars
Pulsed lasers for lifetime measurements
LEDs for lifetimes
Filter holders
Adjustable optics (very important)
Solid sample holders
Slide holders
Integrating spheres
Near-infrared detectors
Bilateral slits
Manual slits
Computer controlled slits
Fast switching monochromators
Filter wheels

References

Laboratory equipment
Spectrometers